Viviers (also Viviers-sur-Rhône) is a city in the department of Ardèche in southern France. It is the smallest city in France by area and population.

The administrative and religious capital of Vivarais, the town of Viviers, on the right bank of the Rhône, in southern Ardèche, retains an important heritage from its rich past, including many listed monuments. These include the Town Hall, in the former bishops' palace; the 18th-century Hôtel de Roqueplane, now the seat of the diocese; the Cathedral of St Vincent, Romanesque, flamboyant Gothic and 18th-century in style, with its choir decorated by Gobelins tapestries and its marble high altar; the 16th-century Knights' House (Maison des Chevaliers) with its Renaissance façade, decorated with medallioned busts; and the Grande Rue with the elegant mansions of Beaulieu and Tourville, both dating from the 18th century.

Population

History
Viviers became the capital of the Gaulish Helvii tribe following the decline of nearby Alba-la-Romaine.

In late Roman times, it also became a bishopric and the capital of the pays Vivarais. Today, it is still the see of the bishop of Ardèche.

In the 6th century, Venant de Viviers served as the Bishop of Viviers.

See also
 Communes of the Ardèche department
 Diocese of Viviers
 Viviers Cathedral

References

Communes of Ardèche
Vivarais
Ardèche communes articles needing translation from French Wikipedia
Populated places on the Rhône
Populated riverside places in France